One Hit Wonders is a television program aired on Canadian music video TV station MuchMusic. The show plays videos by artists widely considered one hit wonders, and also features a set of three hit videos that can be voted for online.

The theme song of One Hit Wonders is meant to resemble an old-school video game from the 1980s, a reference to once very popular, but now forgotten fads, hence the show's name.

Much (TV channel) original programming
Television series by Bell Media